José Miaja Menant (20 April 1878 in Oviedo, Asturias – 14 January 1958 in Mexico) was a General of the Second Spanish Republic.

Early life
He entered the Infantry Academy at Toledo in 1896. His first post was in Asturias.  Miaja was later transferred to Melilla where he served in the Moroccan War of 1900, achieving the rank of major comandante in 1911, and rising to General in 1932. Despite Miaja's membership of the right-wing Unión Militar Española, in 1935 conservative minister of War, José María Gil-Robles y Quiñones, sent him to Lérida, a relatively obscure posting far from the capital, an indication that he did not have the full confidence of the government.

Spanish Civil War
At the start of the military rebellion that led to the Spanish Civil War, he was stationed in Madrid, remaining loyal to the Republican government, and was appointed Minister of War. In November 1936, he was named commander of the Junta de Defensa de Madrid (Madrid Defense Council), when the government evacuated the capital before the imminent arrival of fascist troops. With Vicente Rojo Lluch as chief-of-staff, he managed to halt the Nationalists at the river Manzanares at the Battle of Madrid.

As a Spanish Republican Army commander of the Central Zone, he directed the battles of the Jarama, Guadalajara and Brunete. He later supported the rebellion led by Segismundo Casado against the government of prime minister Juan Negrín in March 1939, serving as President of the National Defence Council (Consejo Nacional de Defensa). He was awarded the Laureate Plate of Madrid for his role during the Siege of Madrid.

Exile
After the end of the Civil War, he went to Gandia, where he boarded a plane to Oran that took him into exile, first to French Algeria and France, then to Mexico, where he died on 14 January 1958.

References

Bibliography

 Alpert, Michael ; El Ejército Republicano en la Guerra Civil, Siglo XXI de España, Madrid, 1989 
 
 Carlos Engel, Historia de las Brigadas Mixtas del Ejército Popular de la República, Ed. Almena. Madrid 1999, 
 Ramón Salas Larrazábal, Historia del Ejército Popular de la República. La Esfera de los Libros S.L. 
 Suero Roca, M. Teresa; Militares republicanos de la Guerra de España. Ediciones Península Ibérica, Barcelona, 1981. 
 Thomas, Hugh. The Spanish Civil War. Penguin Books. 2001. London

1878 births
1958 deaths
People from Oviedo
Spanish generals
People of the Rif War
Spanish military personnel of the Spanish Civil War (Republican faction)
Exiles of the Spanish Civil War in Mexico
Armed Forces of the Second Spanish Republic
Exiles of the Spanish Civil War in France